Cradle Rock Ridge is a mountain located in the Catskill Mountains of New York west-northwest of Frost Valley. Mill Brook Ridge is located north/northeast, Woodpecker Ridge is located east, and Mongaup Mountain is located south of Cradle Rock Ridge.

References

Mountains of Ulster County, New York
Mountains of New York (state)